Air Canada Flight 189 was an Air Canada flight from Ottawa to Vancouver via Toronto and Winnipeg. On June 26, 1978, the McDonnell Douglas DC-9 operating the flight crashed on takeoff in Toronto, killing two passengers.

Aircraft
The aircraft involved was a McDonnell Douglas DC-9 32 series, powered by two Pratt & Whitney JT8D engines and delivered new to Air Canada in April 1968.   At the time of the incident the aircraft had accumulated 25,476 hours of flight time. The aircraft was registered CF-TLV and was the 289th DC-9 built at the Long Beach assembly plant.  The 32 series was a stretched version of the DC-9 that was 15 feet (4.6 m) longer than the original series 10.

Crash
During takeoff, at 8:15 a.m., one of the McDonnell Douglas DC-9-32's tires burst and partially disintegrated, firing chunks of rubber into the landing gear mechanism. This set off an "unsafe gear" warning, prompting the pilot to abort the takeoff. The plane broke into three pieces, but despite its full load of fuel did not catch fire. The accident was visible from Highway 401, which runs alongside the south side of the airport.

The plane was destroyed. Two passengers were killed. Both were seated at the site of the forward split in the fuselage. All of the other 105 passengers and crew aboard were injured.

Investigation
The subsequent investigation found multiple causes of the accident. It recommended greater scrutiny be given to the tires. The pilot, Reginald W. Stewart, delayed four seconds after the warning light came on before he chose to abort the takeoff; a more immediate decision would have prevented the accident. The investigators also criticized the level of training in emergency braking. The presence of the ravine at the end of the runway was also questioned, but nothing was done about it. This failure to expand the airport's overshoot zone was raised when Air France Flight 358 plunged into the same ravine 27 years later.

Aftermath
Although it is customary for some airlines to retire a flight number after a major incident, Air Canada continued to use Flight 189 for its Ottawa-Vancouver route for several years. As of 2018, the flight number is no longer active on Air Canada's timetable.

See also
Air France Flight 358
TAM Airlines Flight 3054
Northwest Airlines Flight 255

References

External links

Airliner accidents and incidents caused by mechanical failure
Airliner accidents and incidents in Canada
Airliner accidents and incidents caused by pilot error
Aviation accidents and incidents in 1978
1978 in Canada
Accidents and incidents involving the McDonnell Douglas DC-9
Air Canada accidents and incidents
Toronto Pearson International Airport
June 1978 events in Canada